Trifluoromethanol is the organic compound with the formula . It is also referred to as perfluoromethanol or trifluoromethyl alcohol. The compound is the simplest perfluoroalcohol. The substance is a colorless gas, which is unstable at room temperature.

Synthesis
Like all primary and secondary perfluoroalcohols, trifluoromethanol eliminates hydrogen fluoride in an endothermic reaction and forms carbonyl fluoride.

 ⇌  +  (I)

At temperatures in the range of -120 °C, trifluoromethanol can be prepared from trifluoromethoxy chloride and hydrogen chloride:

 +  →  +  (II)

In this reaction, the recombination of a partially positively charged chlorine atom (in trifluoromethoxy chloride) with a partially negatively charged chlorine atom (in hydrogen chloride) is used as elemental chlorine. The undesired products, by-products chlorine, hydrogen chloride, and chlorotrifluoromethane, can be removed by evaporation at -110 °C. Trifluoromethanol has a melting point of -82 °C and a calculated boiling point of about -20 °C. The boiling point is thus about 85 K lower than that of methanol. This fact can be explained by the absence of intramolecular H—F bonds, which are also not visible in the infrared gas phase spectrum.

A simpler synthesis uses the reaction (I); an equilibrium can be shifted to the thermodynamically preferred trifluoromethanol at lower temperatures. If the synthesized trifluoromethanol is protonated by superacids, for example  (fluoroantimonic acid), the equilibrium can be further shifted to the left towards the desired product.

Similar to reaction (I), trifluoromethoxides can be prepared from saline-type fluorides (e.g.) and carbonyl fluoride. However, if the  ion is, for example, in an aqueous solution displaced by an acid, trifluoromethanol decomposes at the room temperature.

Occurrence in upper layers of atmosphere
In this case, decomposition of trifluoromethanol is negligible under the conditions prevailing in the atmosphere due to the high activation energy of the reaction. The expected lifetime of trifluoromethanol is several million years at altitudes below 40 km.

See also
Trifluoroethanol

References

Trifluoromethyl compounds
Primary alcohols
Trifluoromethoxy compounds
Organic compounds with 1 carbon atom
Substances discovered in the 1970s